989 Studios was a division of Sony Computer Entertainment America (SCEA) that developed games for PlayStation consoles and Windows personal computers. Their games include EverQuest, Twisted Metal III, Twisted Metal 4, Syphon Filter, Syphon Filter 2, Jet Moto 3, Bust a Groove, and others.

History
The 989 Sports name developed from a long history of name changes and corporate shuffling within Sony centered around operations in Foster City, California. In August 1995, the video game business of Sony Imagesoft was merged with the product development branch of SCEA, becoming Sony Interactive Studios America (SISA) In 1998, SISA was spun off from SCEA and was renamed 989 Studios. On April 1, 2000, 989 Studios was merged back into SCEA as a first party development group, in order to prepare for the then-upcoming PlayStation 2. SCEA continued to release sports games under the 989 Sports brand until the brand was retired in 2005.

Games

As Sony Interactive Studios America
 2Xtreme (1996)
 Blasto (1998)
 CART World Series (1997)
 ESPN Extreme Games (1995)
 Jet Moto (1996)
 Jet Moto 2 (1997)
 MLB '98 (1997)
 MLB '99 (1998)
 MLB Pennant Race (1996)
 NBA ShootOut 98 (1998)
 NCAA Gamebreaker (1996)
 NCAA Gamebreaker 98 (1997)
 NHL FaceOff (1995)
 NFL GameDay (1996)
 NFL GameDay 97 (1996)
 NFL GameDay 98 (1997)
 Rally Cross (1997)
 Spawn: The Eternal (1997)
 Tanarus (1997)
 Twisted Metal (1995)
 Twisted Metal 2 (1996)
 Warhawk (1995)

As 989 Studios
 3Xtreme (1999)
 Bust a Groove (Bust a Move: Dance & Rhythm Action in Japan) (1998)
 Cardinal Syn (1998)
 Cool Boarders 3 (1998)
 Cool Boarders 4 (1999)
 Cyberstrike 2 (1998)
 EverQuest (1999)
 Jet Moto 3 (1999)
 Rally Cross 2 (1999)
 Running Wild (1998)
 Syphon Filter (1999)
 Syphon Filter 2 (2000)
 Twisted Metal III (1998)
 Twisted Metal 4 (1999)

As 989 Sports
 MLB 2000 (1999)
 MLB 2001 (2000)
 MLB 2002 (2001)
 MLB 2003 (2002)
 MLB 2004 (2003)
 MLB 2005 (2004)
 MLB 2006 (2005)
 NBA 2005 (2004)
 NBA ShootOut 2000 (1999)
 NBA ShootOut 2001 (2000)
 NBA ShootOut 2002 (2001)
 NBA ShootOut 2003 (2002)
 NBA ShootOut 2004 (2003)
 NCAA Final Four 99 (1999)
 NCAA Final Four 2000 (1999)
 NCAA Final Four 2001 (2000)
 NCAA Final Four 2002 (2001)
 NCAA Final Four 2003 (2002)
 NCAA Final Four 2004 (2003)
 NCAA GameBreaker 99 (1998)
 NCAA GameBreaker 2000 (1999)
 NCAA GameBreaker 2001 (2000)
 NCAA GameBreaker 2003 (2002)
 NCAA GameBreaker 2004 (2003)
 NFL GameDay 99 (1998)
 NFL GameDay 2000 (1999)
 NFL GameDay 2001 (2000)
 NFL GameDay 2002 (2001)
 NFL GameDay 2003 (2002)
 NFL GameDay 2004 (2003)
 NFL GameDay 2005 (2004)
 NFL Xtreme (1998)
 NFL Xtreme 2 (1999)
 NHL FaceOff 99 (1998)
 NHL FaceOff 2000 (1999)
 NHL FaceOff 2001 (2001)
 NHL FaceOff 2003 (2002)
 Supercross Circuit (1999)
 World Tour Soccer 2002 (2002)
 World Tour Soccer 2003 (2003)

See also
 989 Sports Major League Baseball series

References

External links

PlayStation Studios
Companies based in San Diego
Video game companies established in 1995
Video game companies disestablished in 2005
Defunct video game companies of the United States
Video game development companies
Defunct companies based in California